The Smart Africa Alliance is a partnership among 32 African countries adhering to the Smart Africa Manifesto. Its goal is to accelerate sustainable socioeconomic development on the African continent through usage of Information and Communications Technologies (ICTs) and through better access to broadband services. Other Partners of the Smart Africa Alliance include the African Union, the ITU, World Bank, the African Development Bank, the United Nations Economic Commission for Africa, the GSMA, ICANN and companies. The Smart Africa Alliance board is chaired by President Paul Kagame and the secretariat is led by director general Lacina Koné since March 2019.

Transform Africa Summit 
Smart Africa hosts an annual ICT and Technology Policy conference called the Transform Africa Summit. This is Smart Africa's flagship project which is entering its 6th edition. The summit hosts international heads of state, ministers of ICT, business leaders and policy makers.

References

External links 

 
Transform Africa Summit (yearly conference of the Smart Africa Alliance)

Pan-African organizations
Organisations based in Kigali
Organizations established in 2013